Karl Schneider may refer to:

Karl Schneider (cricketer) (1905–1928), Australian cricketer
Karl Schneider (activist) (1869–1940), German ophthalmologist, activist, resistance fighter against Nazis
Karl Schneider (Austrian footballer) (born 1902)
Karl Schneider (Swiss footballer) (active 1899–1901), Swiss footballer
Karl Max Schneider (1887–1955), East German zoologist
Karl Schneider (German architect) (1892-1945), German architect
Karl Schneider (Swiss architect) (1884–1959), Swiss architect
 Karl Schneider (art director) (1916–1996), German film set designer
Karl Schneider (philologist) (1912-1998), German philologist